Navard Aluminium Mfg. Group is an Iranian Aluminium manufacturer located in Arak. The group exports non-alloy aluminium mainly to Canada, Germany, Japan, Iraq, Qatar, Turkey, and the United Arab Emirates.

Information
Navard Aluminum was established in the year of 1972. The company itself covers an area of 220,000 square meters. Navard Aluminum provides the production of semi-finished and finished aluminum flat products. Navard Aluminum sell their products domestically and internationally to the countries of Germany, Qatar, United Arab Emirates, Turkey, Canada, and Iraq.

Products
The products that Navard Aluminium produces include the following:
Hot Rolled Coils and plate
Plates
Cold Rolled Coils
Strips
sheet and foil
Tread Coil
Embossed Sheets
Irrigation Tubes
Trapezoidal Sheets
Sinusoidal Corrugated Sheets
Composite Panel (ALUCONAM)
Clad (Aluminum Brazing Sheet)
polykraft sheets and coils and corrugated sheet *32 and *5 mm
painted sheet and coils
checkered sheet and coil

contact us
tel no:02154709000
fax no:02154709100

References

External links
Navard Aluminum Mfg. Group

Aluminium companies of Iran
Companies listed on the Tehran Stock Exchange
Iranian brands

Companies based in Arak